Aimwell may refer to:

Aimwell, a racehorse
Aimwell, Alabama, an unincorporated community
Aimwell, Louisiana, an unincorporated community

See also
Amwell (disambiguation)